La Voz Perú (English: The Voice Peru) is a Peruvian reality talent show that premiered on Latina Televisión in 2013. Based on the reality singing competition The Voice of Holland, the series was created by Dutch television producer John de Mol.

History

The voice format was devised by John de Mol, creator of Big Brother, and unlike other singing talent shows because only the voice potential will be evaluated without giving importance to the physical appearance of the participants.

This is a foreign format, produced in different parts of the world with great success in 2011. Peru will voice a jury of four professionals who back the participants will hear them sing. When one of them likes what they hear, the coaches in question will press a button and your chair will turn, making it the "godfather" of the contestant.

The novelty of this show is the dynamics of the program. Unlike other contests of song, this version added an ingredient of coaches, who will be four remain turned on during the performance of the participants. Thus, only from the voice, each coach will select what participants want for your team.

Thus, the contest will be divided into different phases: the instance of a "blind" song, the selection and the duel between teams prepared for special galas shows and live performances.

Format

La Voz Perú is to choose between a group of contestants, of different ages, those who stand out for their vocal qualities without image influence the decision of the coaches, composed of well-known artists who later directed their education. This format aims to try to find the best voice in Peru.

Blind auditions 
In the Blind auditions, each coach completes a team of artists by using only the sense of hearing, being unable to see them. Within ninety seconds, coaches must decide whether they want the participant for their team or not. If several coaches wish to have the same contestant, the last word is of the participant. Once the teams are formed, each coach will be responsible to train the artists for the second phase. In the fourth season, a new element was added, the "Block" button, which allows a coach to block another to prevent them from recruiting the artist on its team. Each coach has granted three blocks to use in the entire stage.

Battles 
In the Battles, each coach will put two (or three, rarely) of their participants head-to-head singing a song together. Both singers should shine in a duet (or trio) and the coach will decide which of them is the winner of the battle. The winners of these battles advance to the next stage. In season two, "Steals" were added, this allows another coach to save another artist from another team who lose the battle. However, in the fourth season, "Steal" was removed in this round. The "Steals" returned the following season, where coaches can save only one artist from another team.

Sing-offs 
From season one through three, in the Sing-offs every coach must save six participants to send them directly to the live shows so that the three missing have to sing in front of the coach the song performed in blind auditions, thus, the coach will save two and will have to eliminate the other to reach the live show with eight participants each team.

Knockouts 
This was introduced in the fourth season, replacing the Sing-offs. In this round, coaches would group the artist into pairs and will sing the song of the artist's choice, and the coach will choose one artist to proceed to the next round. Also, "Steals" were added in this round, allowing another coach to save the losing artist from another team.

Live shows 
In the live shows, each coach will assess their team members weekly, and after the performances, some are saved by the public and others by their coach. In the finale, they not only present songs solo, but each finalist also performs a duet with her coach. The final word is from the public, which enshrines one of the four finalists to be the voice of Peru.

Coaches 

On Saturday, 3 August 2013, the official list of the four coaches of La Voz Perú was released: Puerto Rican singer Jerry Rivera, Mexican pop singer Kalimba, Venezuelan singer José Luis "El Puma" Rodríguez, and Peruvian singer Eva Ayllón. The panel remained for the series' second season, in 2014.

On Monday, 10 August 2015, a new coaching panel was revealed for the third season: returning coach Eva Ayllón, Nicaraguan singer Luis Enrique, Mexican rock singer Álex Lora, and Peruvian singer Gian Marco Zignago.

In May 2021, Latina Televisión confirmed a new season of La Voz Perú. New coaches Mike Bahía, Daniela Darcourt, and Guillermo Dávila join original coach, Ayllón.

On 4 April 2022, Latina Televisión announced via the official La Voz Perú Facebook profile the coaches for the fifth season. Christian Yaipén and Noel Schajris are the new coaches, while Darcourt and Ayllón return as coaches from last season.

In January 2023, it was announced that the coaches for the sixth season will feature returning coach Ayllón, The Voice Kids coach Maricarmen Marín, The Voice Senior coach Raúl Romero, and new coach Mauricio Mesones.

Coaches' teams 
 Winner
 Runner-up
 Third place
 Fourth place

Series overview
Warning: the following table presents a significant amount of different colors.

Kids edition 
La Voz Kids is a Peruvian singing competition produced by Rayo in collaboration with Talpa Media, aired on Latina Televisión on 13 January 2014. After the success of La Voz Perú, Latina Televisión launched an advertisement preparing a children's version, which had already been broadcast in other countries under the format of The Voice Kids. The Peruvian La Voz Kids began recording in November 2013. The show focuses on choosing between a group of children from 8 to 14 years old that stand out for their vocal qualities, with their looks not influencing the decision of the coaches – who are made up of well-known artists who mentor the children. The first three seasons were hosted by Cristian Rivero. Also hosting, the first season counted with Almendra Gomelsky; Gigi Mitre for the second season, and Katia Condos for the third. The coaches for the first season were Peruvian folklore singer Eva Ayllón, Mexican pop singer Kalimba, and Peruvian pop singer Anna Carina. Luis Enrique replaced Kalimba in the third season. The reboot of the La Voz Perú came with a fourth season for the kids. The fourth season started to be broadcast on 19 October 2021, with Ayllón coming back as a coach alongside Christian Yaipén, Daniela Darcourt, and Joey Montana. Rivero was joined by Gianella Neyra to host the show. For the fifth season that began broadcasting in 2022, Rivero returned as host and was joined by Karen Schwarz. Ayllón returned as a coach with new coaches Víctor Muñoz, Ezio Oliva, and Maricarmen Marín.

Series overview
Warning: the following table presents a significant amount of different colors.

Coaches' timeline

Teams

Senior edition 
La Voz Senior is a Peruvian singing competition produced by Rayo in collaboration with Talpa Media, that began airing on Latina Televisión in August  2021. The inaugural season was hosted by Cristian Rivero, and had Eva Ayllón, Daniela Darcourt, Tony Succar, and the duo Pimpinela as coaches. The second season began airing in August 2022 with Ayllón and Darcourt returning as coaches. They were joined by new coaches René Farrait and Raúl Romero.

Series overview

Coaches' timeline

Coaches' gallery

Teams 
 Winner
 Runner-up
 Third place
 Fourth place

Generations edition 
La Voz Generaciones is the Peruvian singing competition produced by Rayo in collaboration with Talpa Media, aired on Latina Televisión. The inaugural season was hosted by Cristian Rivero and Karen Schwarz. The coaches for the first season consisted of Christian Yaipén, mother-son duo Mimy & Tony Succar, and Eva Ayllón.

Series overview

Coaches' timeline

Coaches' gallery

Teams 
 Winner
 Runner-up
 Third place

References 

Peruvian reality television series
p
2013 Peruvian television series debuts
2013 Peruvian television series endings
2010s Peruvian television series
Latina Televisión original programming